James Forbes (1749–1819) was a British artist and writer.

Born in London to a Scots family, Forbes travelled to India in 1765 as a writer for the British East India Company and was resident there until 1784. He was a prolific writer and artist and filled 52,000 manuscript pages with notes and sketches concerning all aspects of Indian life, its wildlife, flora and architecture. In 1781 he visited the Taj Mahal and became one of the first Europeans to draw it.

After returning to England he married and toured continental Europe extensively, including a grand tour in 1796 and 1797 of Germany, Switzerland, and Italy. He eventually returned to England to write  Oriental Memoirs. Largely based on his notes and sketches, it was subtitled selected and abridged from a series of familiar letters written during seventeen years residence in India: including observations on parts of Africa and South America, and a narrative of occurrences in four India voyages was published in volumes beginning in 1813. The book remains a valued record of the culture, flora and fauna of India at the time.

Forbes also published a work in 1810 which advocated the conversion of Hindus to Christianity. The city of Forbesganj in Araria District in the state of Bihar is named after him. He used to live in the place called Sultan pokhar (pond), and the house in which he lived still stands at the compound . The Area around his house was called Residential area, in short form R-Area, which gradually over time, mixing with the local tongue, changed into Araria *R-Area.

Gallery

Notes

References
Forbes - Oriental Memoirs
James Forbes fonds, MSG 276, McGill University Library, Rare Books and Special Collections.

External links

 Bonaparte et Joséphine devant la façade de Malmaison, côté jardin, 1803, Rueil-Malmaison - châteaux de Malmaison et Bois-Préau ; RMN-Grand Palais|nature ouvrage - Notice 50160000410 - N° Inventaire : M.M.69.5.2. see picture online
 A view of Château-Thierry (Sur la Marne, on approaching it, from Paris, 1817, Château-Thierry - musée Jean de La Fontaine - Notice 07840001155 - N° Inventaire : 69.8.1
 View of Mâcon , on the Banks of the Saone, 1857, Mâcon - musée des Ursulines musée Lamartine - Notice 01720000722 - N° Inventaire : 13148
 Letters from France, written in the years 1803 and 1804 : including a particular account of Verdun, and the situation of the British captives in that city, London - J. White, 1806
 Works by James Forbes in Europeana Collections
 Digitized versions of Forbes's 1796-1797 travel diaries available, held by Rare Books and Special Collections, McGill University
Digitized drawings of images featuring in Forbes's Oriental Memoirs available, held by Rare Books and Special Collections, McGill University

1749 births
1819 deaths
British artists
British Indologists
Fellows of the Royal Society
English male writers